Esquina is a word meaning "corner" in both Spanish and Portuguese languages.

Clube da Esquina
Esquina, Corrientes
Esquina Department
Esquinas, an orchestral composition by Silvestre Revueltas

Spanish words and phrases